The Philippine House Special Committee on Globalization and WTO is a special committee of the Philippine House of Representatives.

Jurisdiction 
As prescribed by House Rules, the committee's jurisdiction is on the effects on various social sectors of the World Trade Organization's policies and other actions to harness opportunities offered by globalization for economic development.

Members, 18th Congress

See also 
 House of Representatives of the Philippines
 List of Philippine House of Representatives committees

References

External links 
House of Representatives of the Philippines

Globalization and WTO
Parliamentary committees on International Trade